Thomas Alan Waters (also known as T.A. Waters) (1938–1998) was an American magician, writer about magic, and science fiction author.

History
Born to Thurston Alan Waters and Pauline Ruth (Kunkle) Waters, T. A. Waters was a professional magician and magic author. He wrote several booklets on mentalism and bizarre magic which were later reassembled in his big book Mind, Myth & Magick (1993). At one point, he was the librarian at the Magic Castle, in Los Angeles. He was a founding member of The Delta Group, a private mentalism group with many notable members that was formed in the Los Angeles area.  As a mentalist, he was noted for his Any Card at Any Number routine.

Waters appears (thinly veiled as "Sir Thomas Leseaux", an expert on theoretical magic) as a character in the Lord Darcy fantasy series by Randall Garrett and in Michael Kurland's The Unicorn Girl (1969) (in which he also appears, even more thinly veiled, as "Tom Waters"). He himself wrote The Probability Pad (1970), a sequel to The Unicorn Girl; these two novels, together with Chester Anderson's earlier The Butterfly Kid (1967), make up the collaborative Greenwich Village Trilogy.

Published works
 The Psychedelic Spy (1967)
 Love that Spy! (1968)
 The Blackwood Cult (1968) (Lancer Books) (Magnum Books 73769)
 The Probability Pad (1970) (the third volume in the Greenwich Village Trilogy)
 Psychologistics (1971)
 Centerforce (1974)
 Deckalogue (1982)
 Cardiact (1984) 
 The Encyclopedia of Magic and Magicians (1988)
 Mind, Myth & Magick (1993)

References

External links 

 
 T A Waters bibliography
 T A Waters magic articles
 

American magicians
1938 births
1998 deaths
Mentalists
Card magic
20th-century American novelists
American male novelists
American science fiction writers
20th-century American male writers